Dendrobium mutabile, the variable dendrobium, is a species of orchid endemic to the islands of Java and Sumatra in Indonesia.

References

mutabile
Endemic orchids of Indonesia
Orchids of Java
Orchids of Sumatra
Epiphytic orchids
Plants described in 1825